The 1960 Lafayette Leopards football team was an American football team that represented Lafayette College during the 1960 NCAA College Division football season. Lafayette finished fourth in the Middle Atlantic Conference, University Division, and last in the Middle Three Conference.

In their third year under head coach James McConlogue, the Leopards compiled a 5–4 record. Charles Bartos and Robert Howard were the team captains.

With a 4–3 record in the MAC University Division, Lafayette had more wins than the third-place team, Lehigh (3–2), but placed below the Engineers because of their win percentages. The Leopards went 0–2 against the Middle Three, losing to both Lehigh and Rutgers.

Lafayette played its home games at Fisher Field on College Hill in Easton, Pennsylvania.

Schedule

References

Lafayette
Lafayette
Lafayette Leopards football seasons
Lafayette Leopards football